Rafael Erich's cabinet was the sixth Government of Republic of Finland. The cabinet's time period was March 15, 1920 – April 9, 1921. It was a minority government.

Erich's cabinet's main task was to conclude the official peace treaty with Soviet Russia. The treaty was signed in Tartu, Estonia, on October 14, 1920. Soviet Russia recognized Finland's independence officially and its frontier between the two countries.

Assembly

References

 

Erich
1920 establishments in Finland
1921 disestablishments in Finland
Cabinets established in 1920
Cabinets disestablished in 1921